Federal Declaration of Taking Act of 1931 is a federal statute granting the American federal government power to acquire private land for public use purposes in the United States. The Takings Clause defines private land as eminent domain meaning United States government entity is obligated the award of just compensation to a property owner relinquishing private property for public use purposes.

The 71st Congressional session codified the regulatory taking clause of the constitutional law with the passage of the H.R. 14255 bill. The legislation was enacted into law  by the 31st President of the United States Herbert Hoover on February 26, 1931.

Provisions of the Act
The public property acquisition act was penned as five sections facilitating the transfer of private property appropriated for public use purposes in the continental United States.

Declaration of Taking - 46 Stat. 1421-1422 § I
Acquisition of public building sites for public use
Declaration of Taking to be filed
Statements annexed regarding Declaration of Taking
Title to vest in United States upon deposit of just compensation
Compensation to be ascertained
Interest
No commission charges
Payment upon application of parties in interest
If compensation award exceeds payment made judgment entered for deficit
Power of court to fix time for surrender of possession
Orders respecting encumbrances
Vesting Not Prevented or Delayed - 46 Stat. 1422 § II
Vesting of title not delayed by appeal
Irrevocable Commitment of Federal Government - 46 Stat. 1422 § III
Payment of ultimate award
Right of Taking as Addition to Existing Rights - 46 Stat. 1422 § IV
Prior rights not abrogated
Authorized Purposes of Expenditures After Irrevocable Commitment Made - 46 Stat. 1422 § V
Expenditures when United States committed to pay awards
Validity of title

See also
Bankhead–Jones Farm Tenant Act of 1937
Condemnation Act of 1888
Federal lands
Frazier–Lemke Farm Bankruptcy Act of 1934
History of English land law
Ketch Ranch House (Oklahoma)
Protected areas of the United States

References

Bibliography

External links
 
 
 
 

1931 in law
1931 in the United States
71st United States Congress
Property law in the United States
United States public land law